Aatha Un Koyilile is a 1991 Indian Tamil-language drama film written and directed by Kasthuri Raja. The film stars newcomers Selva and Kasthuri, with newcomer Ravi Rahul, Vinodhini, Janagaraj, Vinu Chakravarthy, K. Prabhakaran, Vadivelu, and Senthil playing supporting roles. It was released on 10 May 1991. The film was remade in Telugu as Prema Vijetha (1992).

Plot 
Pandi is a shy young man. He is the son of the village's bigwig Azhagarsamy. Pandi slowly falls in love with the lovely village girl Easwari who, unlike him, is from a poor family. When the village blacksmith Marudhu learns about their love affair, he warns Pandi about Azhagarsamy's dark side.

In the past, Kasthuri, her parents, and Ramaiah lived together in their big house. Maruthu worked in their house and had much respect for Kasthuri. However, when Kasthuri's cousin Durairasu entered their house in order to marry Kasthuri, problems started. Kasthuri's father halfheartedly accepted the proposal as per the village custom, despite knowing that Durairasu was a bad person. However, Kasthuri refused the proposal and revealed she wanted to marry Maruthu, who was from another caste. Kasthuri's family accepted her wish, and she married Marudhu. At the village court the village heads did not accept the marriage because of the caste difference and Azhagarsamy ordered Kasthuri's father to kill his daughter to restore the village's honour. Later that night, Kasthuri's father fed Kasthuri a meal which he had poisoned. Marudhu came to save Kasthuri, but Durairasu and his henchmen stopped him. Marudhu beats them all, but was too late to save Kasthuri.

Pandi loses hope in being able to marry Easwari, and the lovers decide to kill themselves. The villagers intervene just in time, and Azhagarsamy surprisingly accepts for the marriage in front of the villagers. Later, Azhagarsamy forces Kaliappan to poison his daughter Easwari. Marudhu comes in time to save her, and he encourages Ramaiah to fight against the caste fanatic Azhagarsamy. Pandi and Easwari then marry. Kasthuri's father, Ramaiah, Kaliappan, and Marudhu collaborate to destroy Azhagarsamy, forcing him to drink poison for his crimes.

Cast 

Selva as Marudhu
Kasthuri as Kasthuri
Ravi Rahul as Pandi
Vinodhini as Easwari
Janagaraj as Kaliappan
Vinu Chakravarthy as Ramaiah
K. Prabhakaran as Azhagarsamy
Vadivelu as Appu
Senthil as Pichumani
M. N. Rajam as Kasthuri's mother
T. K. S. Chandran as Kasthuri's father
K. S. Selvaraj as Durairasu
Sevvanthi as Dhanam
Chitraguptan as Nellikunju
Pradeep Raj

Soundtrack 
The music was composed by Deva, with lyrics written by Kalidasan.

Reception 
N. Krishnaswamy of The Indian Express said , "Kasthoori Raja ties up various strands of the narrative well racing to the climax".

References

External links

1990s Tamil-language films
1991 drama films
1991 films
Films about the caste system in India
Films directed by Kasthuri Raja
Films scored by Deva (composer)
Indian drama films
Tamil films remade in other languages